In engineering and materials science, a stress–strain curve for a material gives the relationship between stress and strain. It is obtained by gradually applying load to a test coupon and measuring the deformation, from which the stress and strain can be determined (see tensile testing). These curves reveal many of the properties of a material, such as the Young's modulus, the yield strength and the ultimate tensile strength.

Definition  
Generally speaking, curves representing the relationship between stress and strain in any form of deformation can be regarded as stress–strain curves. The stress and strain can be normal, shear, or mixture, also can be uniaxial, biaxial, or multiaxial, even change with time. The form of deformation can be compression, stretching, torsion, rotation, and so on. If not mentioned otherwise, stress–strain curve refers to the relationship between axial normal stress and axial normal strain of materials measured in a tension test.

Engineering stress and strain 
Consider a bar of original cross sectional area  being subjected to equal and opposite forces  pulling at the ends so the bar is under tension. The material is experiencing a stress defined to be the ratio of the force to the cross sectional area of the bar, as well as an axial elongation:

Subscript 0 denotes the original dimensions of the sample. The SI unit for stress is newton per square metre, or pascal (1 pascal = 1 Pa = 1 N/m2), and strain is unitless. The stress–strain curve for this material is plotted by elongating the sample and recording the stress variation with strain until the sample fractures. By convention, the strain is set to the horizontal axis and stress is set to vertical axis. Note that for engineering purposes we often assume the cross-section area of the material does not change during the whole deformation process. This is not true since the actual area will decrease while deforming due to elastic and plastic deformation. The curve based on the original cross-section and gauge length is called the engineering stress–strain curve, while the curve based on the instantaneous cross-section area and length is called the true stress–strain curve. Unless stated otherwise, engineering stress–strain is generally used.

True stress and strain 

Due to the shrinking of section area and the ignored effect of developed elongation to further elongation, true stress and strain are different from engineering stress and strain.

Here the dimensions are instantaneous values. Assuming volume of the sample conserves and deformation happens uniformly,

The true stress and strain can be expressed by engineering stress and strain. For true stress,

For the strain,

Integrate both sides and apply the boundary condition,

So in a tension test, true stress is larger than engineering stress and true strain is less than engineering strain. Thus, a point defining true stress–strain curve is displaced upwards and to the left to define the equivalent engineering stress–strain curve. The difference between the true and engineering stresses and strains will increase with plastic deformation. At low strains (such as elastic deformation), the differences between the two is negligible. As for the tensile strength point, it is the maximal point in engineering stress–strain curve but is not a special point in true stress–strain curve.

This analysis suggests nature of the UTS point. The work strengthening effect is exactly balanced by the shrinking of section area at UTS point.

After the formation of necking, the sample undergoes heterogeneous deformation, so equations above are not valid. The stress and strain at the necking can be expressed as:

An empirical equation is commonly used to describe the relationship between true stress and true strain.

Materials with a higher  have a greater resistance to necking. Typically, metals at room temperature have  ranging from 0.02 to 0.5.

Stages 
A schematic diagram for the stress–strain curve of low carbon steel  at room temperature is shown in figure 1. There are several stages showing different behaviors, which suggests different mechanical properties. To clarify, materials can miss one or more stages shown in figure 1, or have totally different stages.

The first stage is the linear elastic region. The stress is proportional to the strain, that is, obeys the general Hooke's law, and the slope is Young's modulus. In this region, the material undergoes only elastic deformation. The end of the stage is the initiation point of plastic deformation. The stress component of this point is defined as yield strength (or upper yield point, UYP for short).

The second stage is the strain hardening region. This region starts as the stress goes beyond the yielding point, reaching a maximum at the ultimate strength point, which is the maximal stress that can be sustained and is called the ultimate tensile strength (UTS). In this region, the stress mainly increases as the material elongates, except that for some materials such as steel, there is a nearly flat region at the beginning. The stress of the flat region is defined as the lower yield point (LYP) and results from the formation and propagation of Lüders bands. Explicitly, heterogeneous plastic deformation forms bands at the upper yield strength and these bands carrying with deformation spread along the sample at the lower yield strength. After the sample is again uniformly deformed, the increase of stress with the progress of extension results from work strengthening, that is, dense dislocations induced by plastic deformation hampers the further motion of dislocations. To overcome these obstacles, a higher resolved shear stress should be applied. As the strain accumulates, work strengthening gets reinforced, until the stress reaches the ultimate tensile strength.

The third stage is the necking region. Beyond tensile strength, a necking forms where the local cross-sectional area becomes significantly smaller than the average. The necking deformation is heterogeneous and will reinforce itself as the stress concentrates more at small section. Such positive feedback leads to quick development of necking and leads to fracture. Note that though the pulling force is decreasing,  the work strengthening is still progressing, that is, the true stress keeps growing but the engineering stress decreases because the shrinking section area is not considered.  This region ends up with the fracture. After fracture, percent elongation and reduction in section area can be calculated.

Classification 

It is possible to distinguish some common characteristics among the stress–strain curves of various groups of materials and, on this basis, to divide materials into two broad categories; namely, the ductile materials and the brittle materials.

Ductile materials 
Ductile materials, including structural steel and many other metals, are characterized by their ability to yield at normal temperatures. For example, low carbon steel generally exhibits a very linear stress–strain relationship up to a well defined yield point. The linear portion of the curve is the elastic region, and the slope of this region is the modulus of elasticity or Young's modulus. Plastic flow initiates at the upper yield point and continues at the lower yield point.

The appearance of the upper yield point is associated with the pinning of dislocations in the system. Permanent deformation occurs once dislocations are forced to move past pinning points. Initially, this permanent deformation is non-uniformly distributed along the sample. During this process, dislocations escape from Cottrell atmospheres within the material. The resulting slip bands appear at the lower yield point and propagate along the gauge length, at constant stress, until the Lüders strain is reached, and deformation becomes uniform.

Beyond the Lüders strain, the stress increases due to strain hardening until it reaches the ultimate tensile stress. During this stage, the cross-sectional area decreases uniformly along the gauge length, due to the incompressibility of plastic flow (not because of the Poisson effect, which is an elastic phenomenon). Then a process of necking begins, which ends in a 'cup and cone' fracture characteristic of ductile materials.

The appearance of necking in ductile materials is associated with geometrical instability in the system. Due to the natural inhomogeneity of the material, it is common to find some regions with small inclusions or porosity, within the material or on its surface, where strain will concentrate, leading to a local reduction in cross-sectional area. For strain less than the ultimate tensile strain, the increase of work-hardening rate in this region will be greater than the area reduction rate, thereby make this region harder to deform than others, so that the instability will be removed, i.e. the material increases in homogeneity before reaching the ultimate strain. However, beyond this, the work hardening rate will decrease, such that a region with smaller area is weaker than nearby regions, therefore reduction in area will concentrate in this region and the neck will become more and more pronounced until fracture. After the neck has formed in the material, further plastic deformation is concentrated in the neck while the remainder of the material undergoes elastic contraction owing to the decrease in tensile force.

The stress–strain curve for a ductile material can be approximated using the Ramberg–Osgood equation.  This equation is straightforward to implement, and only requires the material's yield strength, ultimate strength, elastic modulus, and percent elongation.

Brittle materials 
Brittle materials, which include cast iron, glass, and stone, are characterized by the fact that rupture occurs without any noticeable prior change in the rate of elongation, sometimes they fracture before yielding.

Brittle materials such as concrete or carbon fiber do not have a well-defined yield point, and do not strain-harden. Therefore, the ultimate strength and breaking strength are the same. Typical brittle materials like glass do not show any plastic deformation but fail while the deformation is elastic. One of the characteristics of a brittle failure is that the two broken parts can be reassembled to produce the same shape as the original component as there will not be a neck formation like in the case of ductile materials. A typical stress–strain curve for a brittle material will be linear. For some materials, such as concrete, tensile strength is negligible compared to the compressive strength and it is assumed zero for many engineering applications. Glass fibers have a tensile strength stronger than steel, but bulk glass usually does not. This is because of the stress intensity factor associated with defects in the material. As the size of the sample gets larger, the expected size of the largest defect also grows.

See also 

 Elastomers
 Plane strain compression test
 Strength of materials
 Stress–strain index
 Tensometer
 Universal testing machine

References 

Elasticity (physics)
Structural analysis